Claiborne did not serve in the 7th Congress as he was appointed Governor of Mississippi Territory and was replaced in a special election by William Dickson (Democratic-Republican)

See also 
 United States House of Representatives elections, 1802 and 1803
 List of United States representatives from Tennessee

1801
Tennessee
United States House of Representatives